These are the results for the 2005 edition of the Züri-Metzgete race, won by Paolo Bettini after a long breakaway under the rain.

General Standings

02-10-2005: Zürich, 241 km.

External links
Race website 

2005
2005 UCI ProTour
2005 in Swiss sport